The following hotels were owned by the London, Midland and Scottish Railway:

 Euston Hotel, London
 Queen's Hotel, Birmingham
 Midland Hotel, Bradford
 Crewe Arms Hotel, Crewe
 Midland Hotel, Derby
 Furness Abbey Hotel, Furness Abbey
 Station Hotel, Holyhead
 Queens Hotel, Keighley
 Queen's Hotel, Leeds
 Adelphi Hotel, Liverpool
 Exchange Hotel, Liverpool
 Midland Hotel, Manchester
 Midland Hotel, Morecambe
 Park Hotel, Preston
 North Stafford Hotel, Stoke-on-Trent
 Welcombe Hotel, Stratford-upon-Avon
 Station Hotel, Ayr
 Dornoch Hotel, Dornoch (open May to September only)
 Station Hotel, Dumfries
 Caledonian Hotel, Edinburgh
 Central Hotel, Glasgow
 St. Enoch Hotel, Glasgow
 Gleneagles Hotel, Gleneagles (open Easter to November only)
 Station Hotel, Inverness
 Lochalsh Hotel, Kyle of Lochalsh
 Highland Hotel, Strathpeffer (open May to September only)
 Turnberry Hotel, Turnberry
 Midland Station Hotel, Belfast
 Laharna Hotel, Larne (open June to September only)
 Northern Counties Hotel, Portrush
 Greenore Hotel, Greenore (with the GNR(I))

See also
 Lists of hotels – an index of hotel list articles on Wikipedia

References

Notes

Sources
 

London, Midland and Scottish Railway
British railway-related lists
London, Midland And Scottish Railway
London, Midland And Scottish Railway